There are several national parks of Nigeria. The Nigeria National Park Service (NNPS) is responsible for preserving, enhancing, protecting and managing vegetation and wild animals in the national parks of Nigeria.
The NNPS is a parastatal under the Federal Ministry of the Environment, and is headed by a Conservator General.
It works closely with the Nigerian Tourism Development Corporation.

The first national park was Kainji Lake, established by the military ruler General Olusegun Obasanjo in 1979. The National Parks Governing Board and five new National Parks were set up in 1991.

Yankari Game Reserve was upgraded to a national park in 1992, although it was later handed over to the Bauchi State government in June 2006.

The parks cover a total land area of approximately 20,156 km2, or about 3% of Nigeria's total land area.

Parks

References

Nigeria
National parks
National parks